see also Otto Lang (film producer) and Otto Lang (actor)

Otto Emil Lang,  (born May 14, 1932) is a Canadian lawyer and former politician.

Life and career
Lang was born in Handel, Saskatchewan. In 1961, he was appointed Dean of Law at the University of Saskatchewan, the youngest person to be appointed to that position, and served until 1969.

Lang was elected to the House of Commons of Canada in the 1968 election, and was re-elected in the 1972 and 1974 elections as the Member of Parliament for Saskatoon—Humboldt. He served as Minister without Portfolio (1968–70), Minister responsible for the Canadian Wheat Board (1969–79), Acting Minister of Mines, Energy and Resources (1969), Minister of Manpower and Immigration (1970–72), Minister of Justice and Attorney General (1972–75), Minister of Transport (1975–79), Acting Minister of Communications (1975), Acting Minister of Justice and Attorney General (1978), and Minister of Justice and Attorney General (1978). He was defeated in the 1979 federal election by Robert Ogle of the New Democratic Party.

Following his career in politics, Lang served as the Executive Vice-president of Pioneer Grain Co. Ltd., Chairman of the Transport Institute at the University of Manitoba and as president, CEO of Centra Gas Manitoba Inc.  He is currently retired, but serves as a director of several companies, including Investor's Group and the Winnipeg Airport Authority.  In 2005-06 Lang served as the co-chair of the federal Liberal election campaign for Manitoba.

A Rhodes Scholar, Lang holds a B.A. and an LL.B. from the University of Saskatchewan, a B.C.L from Oxford University (Exeter College) and an LL.D. from the University of Manitoba. He played for the Oxford University Ice Hockey Club, winning two Blues.

In 1999, he was made an Officer of the Order of Canada.

Family
Lang is married to Madam Justice Deborah McCawley of the Court of King's Bench of Manitoba. They currently reside in Manitoba. He was previously married to Adrian Merchant, the daughter of Sally Merchant.

Lang is the father of seven children: Maria Lang (d. 1991); Andrew Lang, a communications advisor who was the federal Liberal candidate for the riding of Toronto—Danforth in 2008 and 2011; Timothy Lang, President and CEO of Youth Employment Services in Toronto; Gregory Lang, a consultant; Elisabeth Lang, Superintendent of Bankruptcy at the Office of the Superintendent of Bankruptcy; Adrian Lang, a lawyer and executive at Bank of Montreal in Toronto (she was formerly a partner with the law firm of Stikeman Elliott); and Amanda Lang, a television news personality.

Election results

Federal Riding of Saskatoon East

Federal Riding of Saskatoon Humboldt

Archives 
There is an Otto E. Lang fonds at Library and Archives Canada.

References

External links
 

1932 births
Living people
Canadian Ministers of Transport
Lawyers in Saskatchewan
Canadian King's Counsel
Canadian Rhodes Scholars
Canadian university and college faculty deans
Liberal Party of Canada MPs
Members of the House of Commons of Canada from Saskatchewan
Officers of the Order of Canada
Members of the King's Privy Council for Canada
University of Saskatchewan alumni
People from Humboldt, Saskatchewan
University of Saskatchewan College of Law alumni